Kilkenny is a city, the county seat of County Kilkenny, Ireland.

Kilkenny may also refer to:

Places 
 Kilkenny, South Australia, Australia
 Kilkenny, Edmonton, Canada
 County Kilkenny, Ireland
 Kilkenny, Minnesota, United States
 Kilkenny Township, Le Sueur County, Minnesota, United States
 Kilkenny, New Hampshire, United States
 Kilkenny Castle, Ireland
 Kilkenny (Richmond Hill, Georgia), an estate on the National Register of Historic Places

Transportation 
 Kilkenny railway station, Adelaide, Australia
 Kilkenny Airport, Ireland
 Kilkenny railway station, Ireland

Other uses 
 Kilkenny (surname)
 Earl of Kilkenny, former title of Viscount Mountgarret
 Kilkenny (Dáil constituency)
 Kilkenny College, Ireland
 Kilkenny GAA, Irish county hurling and football teams
 Kilkenny (novel), by Louis L'Amour, set in southeastern Utah
 Kilkenny (beer), a brand of beer produced by Guinness
 Kilkenny (horse), an eventing horse ridden by James C. Wofford in the 1968 and 1972 Olympic Games

See also 
 Kilkenny cat, nickname for a tenacious fighter
 Kilkenny City (disambiguation)